Tenth Avenue, known as Amsterdam Avenue between 59th Street and 193rd Street, is a north-south thoroughfare on the West Side of Manhattan in New York City. It carries uptown (northbound) traffic as far as West 110th Street (also known as Cathedral Parkway), after which it continues as a two-way street.

Geography
Tenth Avenue begins a block below Gansevoort Street and Eleventh Avenue in the West Village / Meatpacking District. For the southernmost stretch (the four blocks below 14th Street), Tenth Avenue runs southbound. North of 14th Street, Tenth Avenue runs uptown (northbound) for 45 blocks as a one-way street. At its intersection with 59th Street, it becomes Amsterdam Avenue and continues as a one-way street northbound until 110th Street (Cathedral Parkway), where two-way traffic resumes.

As Amsterdam Avenue, the thoroughfare stretches 129 blocks northnarrowing to one lane in each direction as it passes through Yeshiva University's Wilf Campus, between 184th and 186th Streetsbefore connecting with Fort George Avenue south of Highbridge Park at West 193rd Street.

On the north side of Highbridge Park, unconnected to Amsterdam Avenue on the south side, Tenth Avenue then runs for slightly less than a mile from the northern terminus of the Harlem River Drive at Dyckman Street, to the intersection of West 218th Street where it merges into Broadway.

History
Tenth Avenue runs through the Chelsea and Hell's Kitchen neighborhoods on the west side of the borough, and then as Amsterdam Avenue, through the Upper West Side, Morningside Heights, Harlem, and Washington Heights. Much of these areas were working-class or poor for much of the 20th century. The street has long been noted for its commercial traffic. The street had grade-level railroad lines through the early 20th century.

The Hudson River Railroad's West Side Line ran along Tenth Avenue from its intersection with West Street to the upper city station at 34th Street, after which it veered to Eleventh Avenue; the line was completed to Peekskill, New York in 1849. Over this part of the right-of-way, the rails were laid at grade along the streets, and since by the corporation regulations locomotives were not allowed, the cars were drawn by a dummy engine, which, according to an 1851 description, consumed its own smoke. While passing through the city the train of cars was preceded by a man on horseback known as a "West Side cowboy" or "Tenth Avenue cowboy" who gave notice of its approach by blowing a horn. However, so many accidents occurred between freight trains and other traffic that the nickname "Death Avenue" was given to both Tenth and Eleventh Avenues.

Public debate about the hazard began during the early 1900s. In 1929, the city, the state, and New York Central agreed on the West Side Improvement Project, conceived by Robert Moses. The  project eliminated 105 street-level railroad crossings and added  to Riverside Park; it also included construction of the West Side Elevated Highway. It cost more than $150 million (about $2 billion in 2017 dollars).

The part of Tenth Avenue north of West 59th Street was renamed "Amsterdam Avenue" in 1890 at the request of local merchants seeking to distance themselves from "Death Avenue" and to increase the value of their properties in an area that had yet to "catch on". The name was intended to recall the Dutch roots of Manhattan's earliest colonization in the 17th century, when the city was known as New Amsterdam. They hoped that the area would become a "the New City" and a "new, New Amsterdam". The Board of Alderman approved the name change, but only after first considering "Holland Avenue"; the change was made just before the vote on the resolution. In their approval, the Board noted that other name changes in the area – such as that of Eleventh Avenue to "West End Avenue" – had "a marked and beneficial effect on property", and said that they held such name changes "as second in importance only to the advantages of increased rapid transit."

The Fort George Amusement Park, now a seating area in Highbridge Park, was located at the northern end of Amsterdam Avenue from 1895 to 1914. 

Tenth Avenue and Amsterdam Avenue were converted to carry one-way traffic northbound in two stages. South of its intersection with Broadway, the avenue was converted on November 6, 1948. The remainder, to 110th Street, was converted on December 6, 1951. Amsterdam Avenue continues to carry two-way traffic north of 110th Street.

During the real estate boom of the late 20th century, Amsterdam Avenue from roughly 59th Street to 96th Street became one of the city's most expensive residential districts.

Transportation
The M11 bus runs northbound along Tenth and Amsterdam Avenues from 14th to 110th Street and in both directions from 110th to 135th Street. North of 72nd Street, the M7 bus also runs northbound on the avenue until 106th Street. The M100 and M101 serve Amsterdam Avenue north of 125th Street.

As part of the 7 Subway Extension, the New York City Subway's  were extended to 34th Street in 2015. An intermediate stop, Tenth Avenue, was originally planned but was dropped from the official plans in 2008. The  serves two stations along the Inwood portion of Tenth Avenue: 207th Street and 215th Street. The IND Eighth Avenue Line has a station at 163rd Street

A protected bike lane was installed in 2016 from 72nd Street to 110th Street.

Notable sites

Cathedral of St. John the Divine
Chelsea Market
The Chitte Building
City College of New York
Columbia University
Empire Diner
General Theological Seminary
High Line Park
Hudson Yards Redevelopment Project
John Jay College
LaGuardia High School
Lincoln Center for the Performing Arts
Manhattan Plaza
Martin Luther King Jr. Educational Campus
MiMA
NewYork–Presbyterian Hospital
Sherman Square
Mount Sinai Morningside
Verdi Square
West-Park Presbyterian Church
Yeshiva University

Gallery

In popular culture
 The Rodgers and Hart play On Your Toes (1936) included the comic dance number "Slaughter on Tenth Avenue", performed by Ray Bolger and Tamara Geva. It was later performed on stage, film and television. It has been performed by the New York City Ballet, and was featured in the film version of On Your Toes, danced by Eddie Albert and Vera Zorina. In the biographical musical Words and Music (1948), a "Slaughter on Tenth Avenue" ballet sequence is performed by Gene Kelly and Vera-Ellen.
 The Girl from 10th Avenue is the name of a 1935 dramatic film starring Bette Davis.
 Slaughter on Tenth Avenue is also the name of a 1957 crime film and the debut album of Mick Ronson in 1974.
 In Moscow on the Hudson (1984), Robin Williams's character Vladimir Ivanoff lived on 1320 Amsterdam Avenue.
 In How I Met Your Mother, Ted Mosby is said to have lived near the corner of 75th Street and Amsterdam Avenue.
 In Donald E. Westlake's "Dortmunder" series of crime novels, the fictional O.J. Bar and Grill (the gang's favorite meeting place) is located on Amsterdam Avenue.
 In the "Asterisk" episode of the American TV drama Suits, Mike Ross mentions renting an apartment "off 10th Avenue", to which his colleague Rachel Zane replies, "Does it come with a bullet-proof vest?".
Amsterdam Avenue is mentioned in the Joe Jackson song "Stranger Than You", from the album Night and Day II.

References

External links

10
Chelsea, Manhattan
Hell's Kitchen, Manhattan
Upper West Side
Inwood, Manhattan
Harlem
Washington Heights, Manhattan
Hudson Yards, Manhattan